Trinoparvus is a genus of beetles in the family Dermestidae, containing the following species:

 Trinoparvus laboriosus Háva, 2004
 Trinoparvus villosus Háva, 2004

References

Dermestidae